Pig Island / Mātau is an island located at the northern end of Lake Wakatipu in the South Island of New Zealand, near the township of Glenorchy. It is slightly smaller and much flatter than its more popular neighbour Pigeon Island.

Buff weka are also present on Pig Island, having been transferred there from Stevensons Island in Lake Wānaka in 2006.

See also
 Desert island
 List of islands

References

External links
 View a map of the Islands of Lake Wakatipu

Uninhabited islands of New Zealand
Islands of Otago
Lake islands of New Zealand